L21 may refer to:

Vehicles 
Aircraft
 Albatros L 21, a German biplane bomber
 Daimler L21, a German sports aircraft
 LZ 61 (L 21), an airship of the Imperial German Navy
 Piper L-21 Super Cub, an American aircraft

Ships
 , a submarine of the Royal Navy
 , a destroyer of the Royal Navy
 , a landing ship of the Indian Navy

Other uses 
 60S ribosomal protein L21
 Kete language
 Ribosomal protein L21 leader
 USA-193, an American satellite